The 1931 Duquesne Dukes football team was an American football team that represented Duquesne University as an independent during the 1931 college football season. In its fifth season under head coach Elmer Layden, Duquesne compiled a 3–5–3 record and was outscored by a total of 85 to 56. The team played its home games at Forbes Field in Pittsburgh.

Schedule

References

Duquesne
Duquesne Dukes football seasons
Duquesne Dukes football